Leandro Fernandes da Cunha (born 25 December 1999), known as Leandro Fernandes, is a Dutch professional footballer who plays as a midfielder for Norwegian First Division club Jerv.

Club career
He made his professional debut in the Eerste Divisie for Jong PSV on 14 October 2016 in a game against Almere City.

On 31 January 2018, Fernandes joined Juventus. He made his first appearance for the club in a preseason match against Bayern Munich on 25 July 2018. 

On 2 September 2019, Fernandes signed with Fortuna Sittard on a season long loan.

On 28 September 2020, he moved to Serie B club Pescara. On 12 April 2021, his contract with Pescara was terminated by mutual consent.

On 15 September 2021, he joined PEC Zwolle for the 2021–22 season.

On 8 February 2022, he signed a three-year contract with Norwegian side Jerv.

Style of play
Fernandes is considered to be a midfielder with strong technical qualities and free kick taking abilities. He usually plays as an attacking midfielder.

References

External links
 
 

1999 births
Living people
Footballers from Nijmegen
Dutch people of Angolan descent
Association football midfielders
Dutch footballers
Dutch expatriate footballers
Netherlands youth international footballers
Jong PSV players
Juventus Next Gen players
Fortuna Sittard players
Delfino Pescara 1936 players
PEC Zwolle players
FK Jerv players
Eerste Divisie players
Eredivisie players
Serie C players
Serie B players
Eliteserien players
Dutch expatriate sportspeople in Italy
Expatriate footballers in Italy
Dutch expatriate sportspeople in Norway
Expatriate footballers in Norway